Banna, officially the Municipality of Banna,  is a 4th class municipality in the province of Ilocos Norte, Philippines. According to the 2020 census, it has a population of 19,297 people.

The word Banna was taken from the native chieftain named Bana. It was formerly known as Espiritu. The name changed under Sangguniang Panlalawigan (SP) Resolution No. 120–95 on March 20, 1995; ratified on March 10, 1996.

Geography

Barangays
Banna is politically subdivided into 20 barangays. These barangays are headed by elected officials: Barangay Captain, Barangay Council, whose members are called Barangay Councilors. All are elected every three years.

Climate

Demographics

Economy

Government
Banna, belonging to the second congressional district of the province of Ilocos Norte, is governed by a mayor designated as its local chief executive and by a municipal council as its legislative body in accordance with the Local Government Code. The mayor, vice mayor, and councilors are elected directly by the people through an election that is held every three years.

Elected officials

Notable personalities 
Linabelle Villarica, Filipino politician, City Mayor of Meycauayan, Bulacan, wife of Henry Villarica

References

External links
[ Philippine Standard Geographic Code]
Philippine Census Information
Local Governance Performance Management System

Municipalities of Ilocos Norte